Kevin Burke (born February 24, 1993) is an American football coach and former professional quarterback. He played college football for Mount Union where he was a two time winner of the Gagliardi Trophy and won the NCAA Division 3 championship.

Burke played professionally in Europe for the Dacia Vikings in the Austrian Football League the Memphis Express as well as the Bern Grizzlies in Nationalliga A.

He currently serves as quarterbacks coach for Mount Union and was previously the passing game coordinator and quarterbacks coach for the Case Western Reserve Spartans.

High school career
Burke led St. Edward High School to the 2010 OHSAA Division I state title, defeating Braxton Miller-led Huber Heights Wayne 35–28.

College career
Burke led the Mount Union Purple Raiders football team to three national championship games, winning in 2012 and losing in 2013 and 2014.

In 2013 and 2014, Burke won the Gagliardi Trophy, the award for most outstanding Division III college football player of the year, becoming the first junior winner and the first two-time winner.

Professional career
After his college career, Burke became a member of the United States national team for the 2015 IFAF World Championship, whom he led to the gold medal.

In 2017, he joined the Vienna Vikings of the Austrian Football League. That year, he recorded 2,990 passing yards (second-most in the league) and 36 touchdown passes as he led the Vikings to the Austrian Bowl championship. Against the Swarco Raiders, he threw for 375 yards and three touchdowns and recorded 121 rushing yards as the Vikings won 45–26; Burke earned game MVP honors for his performance. He also played for the Vikings in 2018 taking the team Austrian Bowl before losing to the Raiders. 

Burke was signed by the Memphis Express of the Alliance of American Football (AAF) on February 21, 2019, following the benching of Christian Hackenberg. He was waived on February 27, replaced by Johnny Manziel. The AAF league folded midway through the season.

Later in 2019, Burke signed and played for the Bern Grizzlies of Switzerland Nationalliga A. 
The Grizzlies lost in the semi final of the playoffs.

Coaching career
During the 2017 season, Burke became the running backs coach for Case Western Reserve Spartans. The Spartans reached the playoffs, where they were eventually eliminated by Burke's alma mater, Mount Union Purple Raiders, in the second round. For the 2018 season, he was named quarterbacks coach for Case Western Reserve, and added passing game coordinator to his role in 2019. In 2020, Burke rejoined his alma mater coaching staff as quarterbacks coach.

References

External links
 Mount Union profile
 Case Western Reserve profile

1993 births
Living people
American football quarterbacks
Case Western Spartans football coaches
Memphis Express (American football) players
Mount Union Purple Raiders football players
People from Westlake, Ohio
Sportspeople from Cuyahoga County, Ohio
Players of American football from Ohio
Coaches of American football from Ohio
American expatriate sportspeople in Austria
American expatriate players of American football
American expatriate sportspeople in Switzerland